"Pauline" is the second song by Zaïko Langa Langa released in 1970. It was composed by Papa Wemba and it was his first song.  The B-side was "La Tout Neige", composed by N'Yoka Longo, the first hit of the orchestra. "Pauline" was the first song performed in the concert honoring the golden jubilee of Zaïko Langa Langa in Brussels on February 29, 2020.

See also

 Papa Wemba

References

1970 songs